Ben Garrod (born 29 January 1982) is an English evolutionary biologist, primatologist and broadcaster. He has been Professor of Evolutionary Biology and Science Engagement at the University of East Anglia since 2019.

Early life
Garrod was born in Great Yarmouth, where he lived in the Elephant and Castle pub and attended East Norfolk Sixth Form College.  , his parents are stewards at Great Yarmouth and Caister Golf Club.

Career and research

Academic and conservation work 
Garrod attended Anglia Ruskin University, where he completed his BSc (Hons) in Animal Behaviour in 2005. He completed an MSc in Wild Animal Biology at the Royal Veterinary College. Garrod completed a doctorate at University College London and the Zoological Society of London. His thesis focused on the evolution of monkeys in tropical islands and was titled "Primates of the Caribbean". He has published on primate pathology and osteoarchaeology.

Garrod spent several years in western Uganda working on the development and management of a leading field site for chimpanzee conservation with the Jane Goodall Institute, where among other things he was responsible for habituating wild chimpanzees. He has also worked in Southeast Asia for an orangutan conservation organisation, in Madagascar studying marine life, and in the Caribbean studying introduced monkeys.

Garrod's institutional affiliations include being a Trustee for the UK Jane Goodall Institute; Ambassador for the Norfolk Wildlife Trust; Ambassador for Bristol Museum and Art Gallery; Patron of the Natural Sciences Collections Association (NatSCA); Ambassador for the Marine Conservation Society; and Fellow of the Linnean Society.

Garrod is a Professor of Evolutionary Biology and Science Engagement at the University of East Anglia. He is also a teaching fellow at Anglia Ruskin University.

Public engagement 
Garrod has presented a series and several television shows, including Attenborough and the Giant Dinosaur with David Attenborough, Baby Chimp Rescue, and Springwatch, in addition to two of his own series; Secrets of Bones and Secrets of Skin on BBC Four. He has also presented numerous short films on the One Show.

He has delivered a TEDx talk and is a regular speaker at conferences, public debates and scientific festivals, including the Cheltenham Science Festival. He also writes scientific articles for The Guardian and The Conversation.

References

1982 births
Living people
Alumni of Anglia Ruskin University
Alumni of the Royal Veterinary College
Alumni of University College London
Academics of the University of East Anglia
English biologists
Primatologists
Fellows of the Linnean Society of London